The 1971 UCLA Bruins football team represented University of California, Los Angeles (UCLA) in the 1971 NCAA University Division football season. The team was coached by Pepper Rodgers and was ranked 15th by AP in the pre-season poll. The team finished the season with a 2–7–1 record.

Regular season

Schedule

Game summaries

USC

The game was played to a 7–7 tie before 68,426 at the Coliseum and a nationwide TV audience. Lou Harris scored for the Trojans and Marv Kendricks scored a 7-yard touchdown for the Bruins. Efrén Herrera kicked the PAT to tie the game in the third quarter.

Awards and honors
 All-Americans: Dave Dalby (C)
 All-Conference First Team: Dave Dalby (C), Bob Christiansen (OE)

References

External links
 Game program: UCLA vs. Washington State at Spokane – October 9, 1971

UCLA
UCLA Bruins football seasons
UCLA Bruins football
UCLA Bruins football